Henry Hays is the son of the fictional Detective Wayne Hays in True Detective season 3.

Henry Hays may also refer to:
Henry Blake Hays (1829–1881), of the coal industry
 Henry Francis Hays, KKK member

See also
Harry Hays (disambiguation)
Henry Hayes (disambiguation)
Henry Hay (disambiguation)